The United States Medical Center for Federal Prisoners (MCFP Springfield) is a United States federal prison in Springfield, Missouri which provides medical, mental health, and dental services to male offenders. It is operated by the Federal Bureau of Prisons, a division of the United States Department of Justice.

History
During the Great Depression, the people of Springfield, Missouri offered  of land to the federal government to build the prison. Congress authorized the building of the prison in 1930. The prison opened in 1933 as the "United States Hospital for Defective Delinquents", under superintendent Marion R. King. The land surrounding the prison was used by the prisoners for farming until 1966. In 1977, the federal government returned some of the original 620 acres to the city. Prison riots occurred in 1941, 1944 and 1959.

Several political prisoners and spies arrested during World War II were held at MCFP Springfield for medical treatment. Anastasy Vonsyatsky served 3 years of a 5-year sentence there for conspiring to aid Hitler's Germany in violation of the Espionage Act before being released in 1946. Robert Henry Best and Herbert John Burgman, who were sentenced to life in prison for treason in 1948 and 1949 for making propaganda broadcasts for the Nazis, served their sentences at this prison. Best died at MCFP Springfield in 1952, Burgman in 1953.

Several high-profile Mafia Bosses received medical treatment at MCFP Springfield, including Joseph Bonanno of the Bonanno crime family, Vito Genovese and Vincent Gigante of the Genovese crime family and John Gotti of the Gambino crime family. Genovese died at MCFP Springfield in 1969, Gotti in 2002, and Gigante in 2005. Other notable inmates held at MCFP Springfield for treatment include Robert Stroud, known as the "Birdman of Alcatraz" who died there in 1963, racecar driver Randy Lanier, drug trafficker Michael Riconosciuto, and "The Toxic Pharmacist" Robert Courtney. Terrorists Omar Abdel Rahman and Jose Padilla were also held there for brief periods.

Notable incidents
On January 26, 2010, inmate Victor Castro-Rodriguez, 51, was found dead on the floor of his cell. Castro-Rodriguez originally was convicted of assault and resisting arrest in the U.S. District Court of Southern Florida and was being held at the MCFP because of a mental illness. MCFP inmates Wesley Paul Coonce, Jr., 34, and Charles Michael Hall, 43, were charged in connection with his death and on May 7, 2014, were convicted of one count of first-degree murder. Coonce was also found guilty of one count of murder by an inmate serving a life sentence. Both were sentenced to death on June 2, 2014.

Notable inmates
The following inmates are currently held at MCFP Springfield or served the majority of their sentence there.
†Inmates who were released from custody prior to 1982 are not listed on the Bureau of Prisons website.

Current

Released

Died at MCFP Springfield

In popular culture
John Sacrimoni, boss of the fictional Lupertazzi crime family in the hit HBO television series The Sopranos, dies at MCFP Springfield in the season 6 episode entitled "Stage 5".

Ercole "Eckley" DiMeo of the fictional Soprano crime family in the hit HBO television series The Sopranos is the unseen longtime boss of the Soprano crime family and is mentioned in season one that he is incarcerated here.

The American crime drama limited series Black Bird follows the true story of James Keene during his time at MCFP Springfield. The series is based on the 2010 autobiographical novel In with the Devil: a Fallen Hero, a Serial Killer, and a Dangerous Bargain for Redemption by James Keene and Hillel Levin.

Gallery

See also

List of U.S. federal prisons
Federal Bureau of Prisons
Incarceration in the United States

References

Sources

External links

 Federal Bureau of Prisons.gov: Official MCFP-Medical Center for Federal Prisoners Springfield website 
 MCFP Springfield on Google Maps
 Springfield-Greene County Library: Historic postcards of MCFP Springfield

Hospital buildings completed in 1933
Federal Bureau of Prisons Administrative Facilities
Prisons in Missouri
Psychiatric hospitals in Missouri
Prison healthcare
Buildings and structures in Springfield, Missouri
Hospitals in Missouri
1933 establishments in Missouri